Angello is a surname. Notable people with the surname include:

 Anthony Angello (born 1996), American ice hockey player
 Steve Angello (born 1982), Greek-Swedish DJ, producer, remixer, and record label owner

See also
 Angelo